is a female Japanese voice actress affiliated with 81 Produce.

Filmography

Television animation
2011
 Sket Dance as Delinquent (ep 37)
 Battle Girls: Time Paradox as Soldier A (ep 11)

2012
 Duel Masters Victory as Kyūsaku
 Baku Tech! Bakugan as Harubaru Hinode
 Beyblade: Shogun Steel as Waitress #2

2013
 Tokyo Ravens as Female Teacher
 Beast Saga as Village Woman A (eps 1, 3)
 Pokémon: Black & White: Rival Destinies as Mareep

2014
 D-Frag! as Mob Son
 Hero Bank as Kaito Kōshō (eps 27–31)
 Future Card Buddyfight as Gao Mikado
 Yowamushi Pedal Grande Road as Elementary School Boy (ep 16); Midōsuji's Classmate (ep 3)

2015
 Future Card Buddyfight 100 as Gao Mikado
 Doraemon as Girl

2016
 Future Card Buddyfight DDD as Gao Mikado

2017
 Future Card Buddyfight X as Gao Mikado

2020
 Sorcerous Stabber Orphen as Volkan

2021
 Sorcerous Stabber Orphen: Battle of Kimluck as Volkan

OVA 
 Magi: Adventure of Sinbad as Boy (eps 1–2)
 Little Witch Academia: The Enchanted Parade as Thomas's Friend

Dubbing roles

Live-action
 The Odd Life of Timothy Green as Rod Best
 Deep Rooted Tree

Animation
 Capture the Flag as Mike Goldwing

References

External links 
 

Living people
Year of birth missing (living people)
Japanese voice actresses
Voice actresses from Tokyo
81 Produce voice actors